Reender Kranenborg (born 1942-2020) is a former editor of the magazine Religious Movement in the Netherlands published by the institute of religious studies of the Free University in Amsterdam.

He received his PhD in the theological faculty about the subject of self-realization. He stated in the dissertation that he had attempted to research the subject following the norms of religious studies, not a theological one.

He had, until his retirement, a seat at the Comitato Scientifico (scientific committee)  of the CESNUR.

Selected bibliography
English
The Presentation of the Essenes in Western Esotericism. Journal of Contemporary Religion, 13 (2): 245- 256. (1998).  
 New Religions in a Postmodern World (2003) Reender Kranenborg and Mikael Rothstein (Eds.) Aarhus University Press 
Field Notes: Efraim: A New Apocalyptic Movement in the Netherlands in  Nova Religio: The Journal of Alternative and Emergent Religions.  2004, Vol. 7, No. 3, Pages 81–91.
 Revelation and Experience in the Theosophical Tradition. A paper presented at CESNUR 2004 international conference, Baylor University, Waco (Texas), June 18-June 20, 2000. Available online
Dutch
Zelfverwerkelijking: oosterse religies binnen een westerse subcultuur (1974) uitgegeven door J.H Kok Kampen  Ph.D. dissertation
Transcendente meditatie: Verlangen naar zinvol leven en religie, uitgegeven door Kok (1977) 
Oosterse geloofsbewegingen in het Westen: Bhagwan-beweging, Hare Krishna gemeenschap, Transcendente Meditatie, Healthy-Happy-Holy-Organization, Divine Light Mission, Yoga, Verenigingskerk (1982), uitgegeven door Zomer en Keuning - Ede,  
Een nieuw licht of de kerk?: bijdragen van nieuwe religieuze bewegingen voor de kerk van vandaag (1984), uitgegeven door Boekencentrum 's-Gravenhage 
De School voor Filosofie als neo-hindoeïstische beweging (Religieuze bewegingen in Nederland), VU Uitgeverij (1985) 
Woorden van de Meesters. Teksten van hedendaagse Indiase denkers over God, mens en wereld. Bijeengebracht, vertaald en ingeleid door Reender Kranenborg, Delft, Meinema, 1988, 
Reïncarnatie en Christelijk geloof, Kampen, KOK, 1989, 
Kranenborg Reender Dr., Stoker Wessel, red, Religies en (on)gelijkheid in een plurale samenleving, Leuven / Apeldoorn, Garant, 1995, 
Neohindoeïstische bewegingen in Nederland : een encyclopedisch overzicht, uitgegeven door Kampen Kok (2002) 

French
Jean-François Mayer (editor) en Reender Kranenborg (editor), La naissance des nouvelles religions, uitgegeven door Georg, Genève, Switzerland, 2004) 

German
Selbstverwirklichung

Italian
L’induismo published by Elledici, Leumann (Torino) 2003,

Notes and references

1942 births
Living people
Religious philosophers
Researchers of new religious movements and cults
Critics of the Unification Church
CESNUR
Western esotericism scholars